Rupesh Paul is an Indian film director, poet, screenwriter and producer. He is known for his films Kamasutra 3D, Saint Dracula 3D and The Secret Diaries of Monalisa.

Early life
He graduated in computer science engineering from University of Madras in 2001, and joined as a sub editor with Malayala Manorama and later as a senior correspondent in India Today.

Career
He directed his short film Mrigam in 2008 which was screened in Festival de Cannes Short Film Corner and You Can't Step Into the Same River Twice in the River to River Indian Film Festival. His first feature My Mother's Laptop starring National Award winning actor Suresh Gopi was screened in International Film Festival of Kerala 2008.

He directed his first international feature Saint Dracula 3D in 2012 and Kamasutra 3D in 2014 and The Secret Diaries of Monalisa in 2018. He directed a web series titled The Great Indian Casino with Ameesha Patel in the lead. His upcoming movies are The Fugitive and Alchemist with actor Sanjay Mishra in the lead. The Vanishing Act based on the disappearance of MH-370 flight is under production as of April 2022.

Controversies 
Rupesh Paul had to apologise on Cannes announcement of his movie The Vanishing Act based on MH-370 flight on account on hurting the sentiments of the relatives of the victims.

Filmography

Bibliography

References

External links 
 

Living people
Film directors from Thrissur
Indian male screenwriters
Indian male poets
Malayalam film directors
Screenwriters from Kerala
20th-century Indian poets
21st-century Indian poets
20th-century Indian male writers
21st-century Indian male writers
Year of birth missing (living people)